Pontophaedusa funiculum is a species of land snail, a gastropod in the family Clausiliidae, the door snails within the subfamily Serrulininae. All door snails have a clausilium with which they can close the shell aperture.

This is the only known species within the Clausiliidae that lays eggs that have hard shells made of calcium carbonate.

Distribution 
Pontophaedusa funiculum lives on the eastern coast of the Black Sea from Sochi in Russia, though Georgia, to Trabzon in Turkey.

References

Clausiliidae
Gastropods described in 1856